Klaus Haertter (born 22 July 1952) is a German fencer. He competed for East Germany at the 1976 and 1980 Summer Olympics.

References

1952 births
Living people
People from Lauchhammer
German male fencers
Sportspeople from Brandenburg
Olympic fencers of East Germany
Fencers at the 1976 Summer Olympics
Fencers at the 1980 Summer Olympics
Universiade medalists in fencing
Universiade silver medalists for East Germany
Medalists at the 1977 Summer Universiade
Medalists at the 1979 Summer Universiade
20th-century German people
21st-century German people